Computer Graphics Metafile (CGM) is a free and open international standard file format for 2D vector graphics, raster graphics, and text, and is defined by ISO/IEC 8632.

Overview
All graphical elements can be specified in a textual source file that can be compiled into a binary file or one of two text representations.  CGM provides a means of graphics data interchange for computer representation of 2D graphical information independent from any particular application, system, platform, or device.

As a metafile, i.e., a file containing information that describes or specifies another file, the CGM format has numerous elements to provide functions and to represent entities, so that a wide range of graphical information and geometric primitives can be accommodated.  Rather than establish an explicit graphics file format, CGM contains the instructions and data for reconstructing graphical components to render an image using an object-oriented approach.

Although CGM is not widely supported for web pages and has been supplanted by other formats in the graphic arts, it is still prevalent in engineering, aviation, and other technical applications.

The initial CGM implementation was effectively a streamed representation of a sequence of Graphical Kernel System (GKS) primitive operations. It has been adopted to some extent in the areas of technical illustration and professional design, but has largely been superseded by formats such as SVG and DXF.

The World Wide Web Consortium has developed WebCGM, a profile of CGM intended for the use of CGM on the Web.

History
1986 – ANSI X3 122-1986 (ANSI X3 committee)
1987 – ISO 8632-1987 (ISO)
1991 – ANSI/ISO 8632-1987 (ANSI and ISO)
1992 – ISO 8632:1992, a.k.a. CGM:1992 (ISO)
1999 – ISO/IEC 8632:1999, 2nd Edition (ISO/IEC JTC1/SC24)
December 17, 2001 – WebCGM (W3C)
January 30, 2007 – WebCGM 2.0 (W3C)
March 1, 2010 – WebCGM 2.1 (W3C Recommendation)

Further reading
Arnold, D.B. and P.R. Bono, CGM and CGI: Metafile and Interface Standards for Computer Graphics, Springer-Verlag, New York, NY, 1988.
Henderson, L.R., and Gebhardt, CGM: SGML for Graphics, The Gilbane Report, Fall 1994.
Henderson, L.R., and A.M. Mumford, The CGM Handbook, Academic Press, San Diego, CA, 1993.
Bono, P.R., J.L. Encarnacao, L.M. Encarnacao, and W.R. Herzner, PC Graphics With GKS, Prentice-Hall, Englewood Cliffs, NJ, 1990.
Vaughan Tay (2001) Making It Work, 5th ed

See also
Comparison of graphics file formats

References

External links

General
Overview of CGM Standards
CGM File Format Summary
WebCGM Resource Page
Technology Reports: WebCGM
Use of CGM as a Scalable Graphics Format
CGM Open - Reference documents & related materials for CGM and WebCGM

Standards
WebCGM 1.0, W3C Recommendation, 17 December 2001
WebCGM 2.0, W3C Recommendation, 30 January 2007
WebCGM 2.1, W3C Recommendation, 1 March 2010
ISO/IEC 8632-1:1999 Part 1: Functional specification
ISO/IEC 8632-1:1999 Part 1: Technical Corrigendum 1
ISO/IEC 8632-1:1999 Part 1: Technical Corrigendum 2
ISO/IEC 8632-3:1999 Part 3: Binary encoding
ISO/IEC 8632-4:1999 Part 4: Clear text encoding

Other 
WebCGM and SVG: A Comparison
CGM Examples

Graphics file formats
Vector graphics markup languages
Open formats
Graphics standards
American National Standards Institute standards
World Wide Web Consortium standards
ISO standards
IEC standards